Team Konica Minolta–Bizhub was a South African cycling team that participated in  the UCI Continental Circuits, primarily in the UCI Africa Tour, from 2005 until the end of the 2009 season. The team's main sponsor was Japanese technology company Konica Minolta. Notable former riders include four-time Tour de France winner Chris Froome, who rode for the team in 2007.

2009 squad

Major wins
2005
 Stage 3a Giro del Capo, Martin Velits
 Stage 6 Vuelta Ciclista a Navarra, Peter Velits
2006
 Overall Giro del Capo, Peter Velits
Stage 2, Peter Velits
 Stage 6 Tour of Japan, John-Lee Augustyn 
 GP Kooperativa, Peter Velits
 Stage 2 GP Tell, Peter Velits
2007
 Stage 6 Tour of Japan, Chris Froome
2008
Tour de Hong Kong Shanghai
Overall, Christoff van Heerden
Stages 1, 2 & 5, Christoff van Heerden
Stage 3b, Adam Blythe

References

External links

Konica Minolta
Cycling teams based in South Africa
UCI Continental Teams (Africa)
Defunct cycling teams
Cycling teams established in 2005
Cycling teams disestablished in 2009
2005 establishments in South Africa